Varntresk Church is a parish church of the Church of Norway in Hattfjelldal Municipality in Nordland county, Norway. It is located in the village of Varntresk. It is one of the churches for the Hattfjelldal parish which is part of the Indre Helgeland prosti (deanery) in the Diocese of Sør-Hålogaland. The brown, wooden church was built in a long church style in 1986 using plans drawn up by the architect Pål Guthorm Kavli. The church seats about 70 people. The church was consecrated on 31 August 1986.

See also
List of churches in Sør-Hålogaland

References

Hattfjelldal
Churches in Nordland
Wooden churches in Norway
20th-century Church of Norway church buildings
Churches completed in 1986
1986 establishments in Norway
Long churches in Norway